The Minnesota Wild is an American professional ice hockey team based in Saint Paul, Minnesota. It plays in the Central Division of the Western Conference in the National Hockey League (NHL). The Wild joined the NHL in 2000 as an expansion team with the Columbus Blue Jackets. The Wild have played their home games at the Xcel Energy Center since its first season. The majority of the Wild is owned by Craig Leipold, and Bill Guerin is their general manager.

There have been five head coaches for the Wild franchise. Jacques Lemaire, who coached the team from its inception to the end of the 2008–09 season, compiled a record of 574 regular-season games coached, 253 regular-season games won, 605 regular-season points, a .527 regular-season winning percentage, 29 playoff games coached, 11 playoff games won, and a .379 playoff winning percentage with the Wild. Lemaire was awarded the Jack Adams Award with the Wild in the 2002–03 season. Todd Richards was hired two months after Lemaire's resignation and fired in April 2011. Mike Yeo was hired by the club in June 2011 and fired in February 2016. John Torchetti was named interim head coach.  On May 7, Bruce Boudreau was signed to a four-year deal as the new head coach, just 8 days after being released by the Anaheim Ducks.

On February 14, 2020, Bruce Boudreau was released by the Minnesota Wild following a disappointing first half of the season. This included Boudreau making a paperwork error that left the Wild with five defensemen in a game on January 15. Dean Evason was named as interim head coach, previously being assistant coach. On July 13, 2020, Evason was hired as the full-time head coach, with a contract extension through the 2021–22 season.

Key

Coaches
Note: Statistics are correct through the 2021–22 season.

Notes
 A running total of the number of coaches of the Wild. Thus, any coach who has two or more separate terms as head coach is only counted once.
 Before the 2005–06 season, the NHL instituted a penalty shootout for regular season games that remained tied after a five-minute overtime period, which prevented ties.
Each year is linked to an article about that particular NHL season.

References
General

Specific

 
coaches
Minnesota Wild head coaches